Yeletsky District is an administrative and municipal district (raion), one of the eighteen in Lipetsk Oblast, Russia. It is located in the western central part of the oblast. Its administrative center is the city of Yelets (which is not administratively a part of the district). Population:  29,627 (2002 Census);

Administrative and municipal status
Within the framework of administrative divisions, Yeletsky District is one of the eighteen in the oblast. The city of Yelets serves as its administrative center, despite being incorporated separately as a city under oblast jurisdiction—an administrative unit with the status equal to that of the districts.

As a municipal division, the district is incorporated as Yeletsky Municipal District. Yelets City Under Oblast Jurisdiction is incorporated separately from the district as Yelets Urban Okrug.

References

Notes

Sources

Districts of Lipetsk Oblast
